This is a list of African American nonfiction writers who are notable enough to be, or are likely to be, the subject of Wikipedia articles and who are largely known for their books or writing:

 (See also)

A
Larry Dell Alexander (born 1953), visual artist, author of commentaries on Christianity
Chalmers Archer (1928–2014)

B
Christopher C. Bell (born 1933)

C
Jennie Carter (1830–1881), journalist and essayist
Julia Ringwood Coston, 19th-century Afro-American publisher and magazine editor who founded the first magazine ever published for black women

D
W. E. B. Du Bois (1868–1963), writer, activist, scholar

G
Henry Louis Gates, Jr. (born 1950), literary critic and Harvard professor
Lawrence Otis Graham (born 1962), attorney, speaker, and New York Times best-selling author
John Langston Gwaltney (1928–1998), anthropologist, author of Drylongso

H
Karla F.C. Holloway (born 1949), author, scholar, professor, administrator Duke University
bell hooks (1952–2021), feminist, author, professor

K
Elizabeth Keckley (1818–1907), wrote a controversial book about her time at the White House as Mary Todd Lincoln's employee and confidante

M

Denise Monique (born 1977), author of "Despite My Odds: A Memoir," published February 2020

E. Frederic Morrow (c. 1906–1994), author of Black Man in the White House, a memoir of his years as the first African American appointed to a president's administrations (1955–1960)

N
Neil deGrasse Tyson (born 1958),  astrophysicist and science communicator

P
Rosa Parks (1913–2005), civil rights leader

S
 Thomas Sowell (born 1930), economist, syndicated columnist, academic at the Hoover Institution

T
 Beverly Daniel Tatum, writer, former president of Spelman College
 Lynn Toler (born 1959), arbitrator on Divorce Court
 Lisa Tolliver, academic-practitioner, editor, journalist, and writer

W
Cornel West (born 1953), public intellectual, author, Princeton University professor
 Steven Whitehurst (born 1967), award-winning author

Z 
 Zamba Zembola (born c. 1780), the supposed author of an 1847 slave narrative, The Life and Adventures of Zamba, an African Negro King; and his Experience of Slavery in South Carolina

See also
 List of African-American authors

Notes

Writers, List of African American nonfiction
Lists of American writers